Michael Barnes was the mayor pro tempore of Charlotte, North Carolina. He also served as acting mayor for a short time following the resignation of former mayor Patrick Cannon, who was arrested on March 26, 2014 for corruption charges. Barnes immediately became acting mayor upon Cannon's resignation. The City Council was then required to appoint a mayor to serve out the remainder of Cannon's term (through Dec. 2015). On April 7, the council voted to appoint Dan Clodfelter, a state senator, as the new mayor.

Barnes, an attorney and a member of the Democratic Party, served as a member of the Charlotte City Council representing District 4 for four terms until he was elected to an at-large seat in the 2013 election. Following that election, he was chosen as the new mayor pro tem by his colleagues.

In 2015, Barnes declined to run for re-election for his City Council seat and instead pursued the Democratic nomination for Mayor of Charlotte. He placed fourth in the primary, losing to former Chair of the Mecklenburg County Commission Jennifer Roberts, and left City Council in December 2015.  He was succeed as Mayor Pro Tem by at-large City Council member Vi Lyles.

References

External links
Official site of Mayor of Charlotte

Living people
North Carolina Democrats
Mayors of Charlotte, North Carolina
Charlotte, North Carolina City Council members
Year of birth missing (living people)
Place of birth missing (living people)
University of North Carolina at Chapel Hill alumni
North Carolina Central University alumni